(8 December 1657 – 20 July 1703), formally known as Prince Gong, was a Manchu prince of the Qing dynasty. He was born in the Aisin Gioro clan as the fifth son of the Shunzhi Emperor, making him a half-brother of the Kangxi Emperor.

Life
Changning received his princedom on 1 March 1671. In August 1690, he was named one of two commanders-in-chief for an expedition against Dzungar leader Galdan, a long-time enemy of the Qing Empire. Having been granted the title of "Great General Who Pacifies the North" (安北大將軍), he was ordered to march his armies through the Xifengkou Pass (喜峰口) north of Beijing, and then to combine his forces with those of his half-brother, Fuquan, the other commander-in-chief, in order to attack Galdan. They reached Galdan's position on September 3, but after a battle that ended in a standstill, they let Galdan escape, a mistake for which Changning was stripped of his place on the Deliberative Council of Princes and High Officials. In 1696, Changning took part in a new campaign that decisively weakened Galdan before the latter's final defeat in 1697. When he died on 20 July 1703, Changning was not given posthumous honors equal to his princely rank, and was not allowed to pass on his title to his descendants, who instead inherited diminished ranks according to the laws concerning the transmission of Qing nobility titles.

Family 
Primary Consort

 First primary consort, of the Nara clan
 Second primary consort, of the Ma clan
 Yongshou, General of the Second Rank (15 December 1671 – 7 June 1686), first son

Concubine

 Mistress, of the Jin clan
 Princess Chunxi of the First Rank (28 December 1671 – 13 January 1742), first daughter
 Married Bandi (1664–1755) of the Khorchin Borjigit clan in 1690
 Third daughter (23 December 1674 – January/February 1681)
 Fourth daughter (3 December 1676 – January/February 1679)

 Mistress, of the Šušu Gioro clan
 Manduhu, Duke of the First Rank (25 October 1674 – 11 June 1731), second son
 Fifth daughter (8 January 1677 – December 1678 or January 1679)

 Mistress, of the Chen clan
 Second daughter (30 March 1674 – May/June 1695)
 Married Du'erma of the Manchu Gūwalgiya clan in September/October 1688
 Haishan, Prince Ximin of the Third Rank (4 June 1676 – 21 March 1743), third son

 Mistress, of the Sakda clan
 Duiqing'e, General of the Second Rank (17 March 1681 – 4 October 1742), fourth son
 Zhuotai, General of the Second Rank (21 September 1683 – 4 July 1705), fifth son
 Seventh daughter (5 April 1686 – September/October 1687)

 Mistress, of the Niohuru clan
 Sixth daughter (22 August 1684 – April/May 1712)
 Married Du'erma of the Manchu Gūwalgiya clan in January/February 1698

 Mistress, of the Wu clan
 Wenshubao (26 February 1687 – 4 October 1708), sixth son

Ancestry

In fiction and popular culture
 Portrayed by Tsui Wing in The Life and Times of a Sentinel (2011).

See also
 Royal and noble ranks of the Qing dynasty
 Ranks of imperial consorts in China#Qing

Notes

References

 

1657 births
1703 deaths
Shunzhi Emperor's sons